Polaveno is a comune in the province of Brescia, in Lombardy. Neighbouring communes are Sarezzo, Iseo, Ome and Sulzano.

References